The UK Singles Chart is one of many music charts compiled by the Official Charts Company that calculates the best-selling singles of the week in the United Kingdom. Since 2004 the chart has been based on the sales of both physical singles and digital downloads, with airplay figures excluded from the official chart. Since 2004 the chart has been based on the sales of both physical singles and digital downloads, with airplay figures excluded from the official chart. From 6 July, streaming figures became incorporated into the singles chart which means that a song will count as a sale, if streamed 100 times. This list shows singles that peaked in the Top 10 of the UK Singles Chart during 2014, as well as singles which peaked in 2013 but were in the top 10 in 2014. The entry date is when the single appeared in the top 10 for the first time (week ending, as published by the Official Charts Company, which is six days after the chart is announced).

One-hundred and fifty-five singles were in the top ten in 2014. Seven singles from 2013 remained in the top 10 for several weeks at the beginning of the year. "Happy" by Pharrell Williams" (from the Despicable Me 2 soundtrack) and "Trumpets" by Jason Derulo were the singles from 2013 to reach their peak in 2014. Fifty-eight artists scored multiple entries in the top 10 in 2014. Ariana Grande, Clean Bandit, George Ezra, Jess Glynne, Meghan Trainor and Shawn Mendes were among the many artists who achieved their first UK charting top 10 single in 2014.

The first number-one single of the year was "Happy", which spent four non-consecutive weeks on top of the chart. The song vacated number-one for a week on 11 January 2014, being replaced by "Timber" by Kesha and Pitbull before returning to the top spot. Overall, thirty-eight different singles peaked at number-one in 2014, with Ed Sheeran and Sam Smith (3) having the joint most singles hit that position (including artist's participation on the Band Aid 30 charity single).

Background

Multiple entries
One-hundred and fifty-two singles charted in the top 10 in 2014, with one-hundred and forty-three singles reaching their peak this year.

Fifty-eight artists scored multiple entries in the top 10 in 2014. Sam Smith secured the record for most top 10 hits in 2014 with five hit singles.

Chart debuts
Ninety-four artists achieved their first top 10 single in 2014, either as a lead or featured artist. This includes the charity group Band Aid 30 (made up of chart acts but charting together for the first time) and Gareth Malone's All Star Choir. Of these, ten went on to record another hit single that year: Ariana Grande, Ella Henderson, George Ezra, Gorgon City, Kiesza, Melissa Steel, Neon Jungle, Robin Schulz, Sam Martin and Tiësto. 5 Seconds of Summer and Clean Bandit achieved two more chart hits in 2014. Jess Glynne had three other entries in her breakthrough year.

The following table (collapsed on desktop site) does not include acts who had previously charted as part of a group and secured their first top 10 solo single.  

Notes
French Montana was featured on the East/West coast version of Chris Brown's "Loyal" but not credited on the UK release. Becky Hill previously sang uncredited vocals on the Wilkinson song "Afterglow" in 2013. Clean Bandit officially had three singles as a group this year, but their members Grace Chatto and Jack and Luke Patterson featured on the Band Aid 30 charity single "Do They Know It's Christmas?".

Songs from films
Original songs from various films entered the top 10 throughout the year. These included "Happy" (from Despicable Me 2), "Boom Clap" (The Fault in Our Stars), "Wasted" (22 Jump Street) and "Beating Heart" (Divergent).

Best-selling singles
Pharrell Williams had the best-selling single of the year with "Happy. The song spent 20 weeks in the top 10 (including four weeks at number one), sold around 1.85 million copies (including streams) and was certified 4× platinum by the BPI. "Rather Be" by Clean Bandit featuring Jess Glynne  came in second place, selling more than 1.52 million and losing out by around 330,000 sales. John Legend's "All of Me", "Waves" from Mr Probz and "Thinking Out Loud" by Ed Sheeran made up the top five. Singles by Ella Henderson, Sam Smith, Meghan Trainor, Pitbull and George Ezra were also in the top 10 best-selling singles of 2014.

"Happy" also stands as the 9th biggest-selling single of all time in the UK (as of December 2017).

Top-ten singles
Key

Entries by artist

The following table shows artists who achieved two or more top 10 entries in 2014, including singles that reached their peak in 2013. The figures include both main artists and featured artists, while appearances on ensemble charity records are also counted for each artist. The total number of weeks an artist spent in the top ten in 2014 is also shown.

Notes

 "Roar" re-entered the top 10 at number 8 on 4 January 2014 (week ending).
 "Counting Stars" re-entered the top 10 at number 10 on 4 January 2014 (week ending).
 "Animals" re-entered the top 10 at number 8 on 11 January 2014 (week ending).
 "Drunk in Love" re-entered the top 10 at number 9 on 8 February 2014 (week ending).
 "Dark Horse" re-entered the top 10 at number 10 on 19 April 2014 (week ending).
 "All of Me" re-entered the top 10 at number 4 on 15 November 2014 (week ending).
 "I'm a Freak" re-entered the top 10 at number 9 on 12 April 2014 (week ending).
 Released as the official single for Sport Relief.
 "Fancy" re-entered the top 10 at number 9 on 10 May 2014 (week ending).
 "Noble England" was originally released in 2010, but charted at number 7 following Mayall's death on 9 June 2014 (week ending).
 "Budapest" re-entered the top 10 at number 10 on 11 October 2014 (week ending).
 "I'm Not the Only One" re-entered the top 10 at number 10 on 1 November 2014 (week ending).
 "All About That Bass" re-entered the top 10 at number 10 on 6 December 2014 (week ending) and again at number 10 on 27 December 2014 (week ending).
 "Steal My Girl" re-entered the top 10 at number 7 on 8 November 2014 (week ending).
 "Outside" re-entered the top 10 at number 10 on 13 December 2014 (week ending).
 Released as the official single for Children in Need.
 “Real Love” was used by ‘’John Lewis’’ in their Christmas television advertising campaign.
 “Real Love” was a cover of the last single officially released by The Beatles. 
 "Do They Know It's Christmas?" re-entered the top 10 at number 3 on 20 December 2014 (week ending).
 Released as a charity single by Band Aid 30 to aid the Ebola crisis in Western Africa.
 Figure includes an appearance on the "Do They Know It's Christmas?" charity single by Band Aid.
 Figure includes appearance on Calvin Harris' "Outside".
 Figure includes song that peaked in 2013.
 Figure includes three top 10 hits with the group Clean Bandit.
 Figure includes three top 10 hits with the group One Direction.
 Figure includes appearances on Route 94's "My Love" and Clean Bandit's "Rather Be".
 Figure includes appearance on Sigma's "Changing".
 Figure includes two top 10 singles with the group Coldplay.
 Figure includes appearance on Ariana Grande's "Problem".
 Figure includes appearance on Enrique Iglesias' "I'm a Freak".
 Figure includes appearance on Iggy Azalea's "Black Widow".
 Figure includes appearance on Iggy Azalea's "Fancy".
 Figure includes appearances on The Vamps' "Somebody to You" and Olly Murs' "Up".
 Figure includes single that first charted in 2013 but peaked in 2014.
 Figure includes appearance on DJ Cassidy's "Calling All Hearts".
 Figure includes appearance on Blonde's "I Loved You".
 Figure includes appearances on David Guetta's "Dangerous" and "Lovers on the Sun".
 Figure includes appearance on Eminem's "Guts Over Fear".
 Figure includes appearance on DVBBS and Borgeous' "Tsunami (Jump)".
 Figure includes appearance on Chris Brown's "New Flame".

See also
2014 in British music
List of number-one singles from the 2010s (UK)

References

External links
2014 singles chart archive at the Official Charts Company (click on relevant week)

United Kingdom
Top 10 singles
2014